Michele Cevoli (born 28 July 1998) is a Sanmarinese football player who plays as a defender for A.C. Juvenes/Dogana.

Career
He begins with the Under-21 national team on September 1, 2016 in the 2017 European Cup qualifier against Spain (0-6).
In a 9–0 defeat to Russia, Cevoli scored two own goals in the first half.

Cevoli re-joined Cattolica ahead of the 2019–20 season, but moved on to S.S. Pennarossa in January 2020.

References

External links

1998 births
Living people
Sammarinese footballers
Association football defenders
A.S.D. Victor San Marino players
San Marino international footballers